The Xavier Musketeers baseball team is the varsity intercollegiate baseball program of Xavier University in Cincinnati, Ohio, United States. The program's first season was in 1974, and it has been a member of the NCAA Division I Big East Conference since the start of the 2014 season. Its home venue is J. Page Hayden Field, located on Xavier's campus. Billy O'Conner is the team's head coach starting in the 2018 season. The program has appeared in 4 NCAA Tournaments. It has won four conference tournament championships and 2 regular season conference titles. As of the start of the 2022 Major League Baseball season, 8 former Musketeers have appeared in Major League Baseball.

History

Early history
The program's first season of play was 1926.

Conference affiliations
 Midwestern City Conference (1981–1995)
 Atlantic 10 Conference (1996–2013)
 Big East Conference (2014–present)

J. Page Hayden Field

Xavier began playing at the location in the 1920s. In 1935, the field's dimensions were adjusted with the construction of the O'Connor Sports Center beyond the right center field fence. The field was renovated again in 1982 because of a donation made under the name of J. Page Hayden (1898-1979), the field's namesake.  Following the 2010 season, a new playing surface, brick backstop, and dugouts were added.

From 1980-2013, Xavier baseball has a 450-307-3 overall record at the field.

Head coaches
Xavier's longest tenured head coach are John Morrey, who has coached the team for 12 years.

Current coaching staff
 Head coach – Billy O'Conner
 Assistant coach – Brian Furlong
 Assistant coach – Austin Cousino
 Volunteer assistant coach – Jake Yacinich

Musketeers in the Major Leagues

Taken from Baseball Reference. Updated June 28, 2021.

See also
 List of NCAA Division I baseball programs

References

External links
 

 
1926 establishments in Ohio
Baseball teams established in 1926